Lykhny (Abkhaz and Russian: Лыхны) is a village in the Gudauta District of Abkhazia, a disputed region on the Black Sea coast.

History 
In medieval Georgian sources the village is also known as Zupu (ზუფუ). The village lies along the narrow Black Sea plain of Abkhazia at an elevation of 50 meters above sea level. Lykhny is located five kilometers from the administrative center of Gudauta. There are several important historical monuments in and around Lykhny. Of particular importance are the 10-11th century Church of the Virgin Mary and the ruins of a two-storey palace which was used as a residence by the princes of Abkhazia (the palace collapsed in 1866 when the Russian punitive expedition attacked the village). An older monument, the fortress of Abaanta (built in the 7th century) is located at the edge of the village on the left bank of the Khipsta River.

Lykhnashta, a large square located centrally in the village, is one of the seven shrines of the Abkhaz people and the place where is held the harvest festival every October. The square was also the place of the gathering of all the Abkhaz in 1931 and 1989.

See also
 Shervashidze’s Palace

References

Populated places in Gudauta District
Sukhum Okrug
Immovable Cultural Monuments of National Significance of Georgia